Nathan Healey (born 27 February 1980 in Gosford, New South Wales) is an Australian tennis player.

Turning professional in 1998, Healey has won 3 doubles titles.

In 2006, he earned a wildcard to the Australian Open, making the 3rd round, where he was defeated by Russian Nikolay Davydenko in four sets.  Later that year, he made it to the 3rd qualifying round at Wimbledon, where he was soundly defeated by Robert Kendrick.  As of 26 June 2006, Healey was 199th in the ATP rankings.

In January 2007 Healey substituted for Mark Philippoussis after the latter sustained a knee injury during the Hopman Cup in Perth.  He lost a close match against American Mardy Fish, but then teamed with Alicia Molik to win the mixed doubles against Fish and Ashley Harkleroad.

Healey is married to Marnie Heller of Wyomissing, Pennsylvania.

In August 2009, he became the coach of fellow tennis player and former world number 1., Lleyton Hewitt; replacing Tony Roche. Healey resigned as Hewitt's coach for family reasons in August 2010.

Nathan relocated to the Philadelphia area to be close to his family in 2010 and started working with local juniors. Nathan was drafted in 2011 to play for the Philadelphia Freedoms of the WTT..

He currently coaches ATP player Max Purcell.

Career finals

Doubles: 6 (3–3)

References

External links 
 
 
 
 Healey World ranking history

1980 births
Living people
Australian emigrants to the United States
Australian male tennis players
Hopman Cup competitors
People from Gosford
Tennis people from New South Wales
Tennis players from Philadelphia